Kjos or Kjøs is a Norwegian surname.

Notable people with the surname include:

 Alv Kjøs (1894–1990), Norwegian politician
 Bjørn Kjos (born 1946), Norwegian aviator, lawyer, and businessman
 Caroline Hagen Kjos (born 1984), Norwegian businesswoman
 Kari Kjønaas Kjos (born 1962), Norwegian politician
 Kjeld Kjos (1905–1983), Norwegian footballer
 Neil A. Kjos, American founder of the Neil A. Kjos Music Company

References